The Royal Ministry of Justice and Public Security is a Norwegian government ministry that oversees justice, the police, and domestic intelligence. The main purpose of the ministry is to provide for the maintenance and development of the basic rule of law.  An overriding objective is to ensure the security of society and of individual citizens. The ministry was founded in 1818 and currently employs about 400 people in the central government department. Its subordinate agencies include the Norwegian Police Service, the Norwegian Correctional Service, the Norwegian Police Security Service, the Norwegian Prosecuting Authority, the Judiciary of Norway, and the Directorate of Immigration, and employ around 30,000 people. The Ministry of Justice of Norway oversees the administration of justice in Svalbard.

History

The ministry was founded in 1818 and was known as the Royal Ministry of Justice and the Police from its establishment until 2012, when it was renamed the Royal Ministry of Justice and Public Security. The ministry's headquarters was bombed in the 2011 terrorist attacks, killing three employees. The ministry subsequently moved to its current location at Gullhaug Torg in Nydalen.

People

The Minister of Justice and Public Security is the head of the ministry. Since October 2021 Emilie Enger Mehl has served as Minister of Justice and Public Security.

Organisation
It is organized into the following sections:

 Press and public relations
 Penal and rehabilitation matters
 Legal issues
 Arctic affairs
 Police
 Rescue and readiness
 Civil rights issues
 Planning and administration
 Analytics

Subordinate agencies
Norwegian Police Service
Norwegian Correctional Service
Norwegian Police Security Service
Norwegian Prosecuting Authority
Judiciary of Norway
Norwegian Directorate for Civil Protection
Directorate for Emergency Communication
Norwegian Military Prosecution Authority
Joint Rescue Coordination Centres
Mediation Service
Norwegian Advisory Council on Bankruptcy
Office for Compensation for Victims of Violent Crime
Norwegian Bureau for the Investigation of Police Affairs
Norwegian Civil Affairs Authority
Crime Prevention Council
Norwegian Centre for Violence and Traumatic Stress Studies
Directorate of Immigration
Directorate of Integration and Diversity

Current issues
On September 8, 2006, the government commissioned an inquiry on the wrongful conviction of Fritz Moen.

References

Ministry
Justice and the Police
1818 establishments in Norway
Ministries established in 1818